Dennis Jay Paulson (born September 27, 1962) is an American professional golfer.

Paulson was born in San Gabriel, California. He had a PGA Tour victory in 2000. His tour nickname is The Chief.

Paulson has been featured in the top 50 of the Official World Golf Rankings.

After Paulson's playing career slowed, he became a radio commentator on the PGA Tour's Sirius XM station.

Professional wins (8)

PGA Tour wins (1)

PGA Tour playoff record (1–2)

Nike Tour wins (1)

Nike Tour playoff record (1–0)

Other wins (6)
1990 California State Open
1991 Philippine Open
1993 Utah Open
1996 California State Open, Long Beach Open
1997 Straight Down Fall Classic (with Ed Cuff Jr.)

Results in major championships

CUT = missed the half-way cut
WD = Withdrew
"T" = tied

Results in The Players Championship

CUT = missed the halfway cut
"T" indicates a tie for a place

Results in World Golf Championships

1Cancelled due to 9/11

QF, R16, R32, R64 = Round in which player lost in match play
"T" = Tied
NT = No tournament

See also
1993 PGA Tour Qualifying School graduates
1998 Nike Tour graduates

References

External links

American male golfers
PGA Tour golfers
Korn Ferry Tour graduates
Golfers from California
People from San Gabriel, California
1962 births
Living people